Vanessa Clerveaux (born 17 June 1994) is a US-born Haitian athlete specialising in the high hurdles. She won a silver medal at the 2018 Central American and Caribbean Games.

Her personal bests are 12.98 seconds in the 100 metres hurdles (-0.3 m/s, Montgeron 2019),  and 8.05 seconds in the 60 metres hurdles (Nashville 2017).

International competitions

References

1994 births
Living people
Haitian female hurdlers
Athletes (track and field) at the 2019 Pan American Games
Pan American Games competitors for Haiti
Alabama Crimson Tide women's track and field athletes
Central American and Caribbean Games medalists in athletics